Chinenye "Chiney" Ogwumike (born March 21, 1992) is a American professional basketball player for the Los Angeles Sparks of the Women's National Basketball Association (WNBA). In 2020, she became the first Black woman and the first WNBA player to host a national radio show for ESPN. She was one of the first and youngest commentators ever to be named an NBA analyst for the network covering the NBA, WNBA, and variety of sports, while simultaneously playing in the WNBA. Chiney is a graduate of Stanford University, where she majored in International relations. She played in three Final Fours and finished as the conference leader in scoring and rebounding as of January 3, 2014. As of 2016, Ogwumike was elected Vice-President of the WNBA Players Association, and signed an endorsement deal with Adidas. In May 2018, Ogwumike signed a multi-year contract with ESPN to become a full-time basketball analyst.

High school 
Born in Tomball, Texas, Ogwumike attended Cypress Fairbanks High School in nearby Cypress, Texas, winning the 5A State Championship in her sophomore and senior seasons. Ogwumike was named a WBCA and McDonald's All-American. She participated in the 2010 WBCA High School All-America Game, where she scored 24 points, and earned MVP honors for the White team.

College 
Ogwumike chose Stanford over Connecticut and Notre Dame, joining her sister Nneka Ogwumike.

Ogwumike ended her Stanford career in 2014 as the all-time career scoring leader for either sex in Pac-12 Conference history, a record that fell in 2016 to Kelsey Plum of Washington.

USA Basketball 
Ogwumike was named to the USA Basketball U18 team. The USA team was one of eight teams from North, South and Central America, along with the Caribbean, invited to participate in the 2010 FIBA Americas U18 Championship For Women, held at the U.S. Olympic Training Center, in Colorado Springs, Colorado. The team was coached by Jennifer Rizzotti. Ogwumike started all five games and was the leading scorer with 13.2 points per game. She was also the leading rebounder with 7.4 rebounds per game. The USA team won all five games and captured the gold medal.

The usual sequence is for the players on the U18 team to move to the U19 team. However. Ogwumike played so well as a U18 that she was promoted to the World University Games team for the 2011 World University Games held in Shenzhen, China. Chiney was not the only Ogwumike on the team, as her sister, Nneka Ogwumike, was also on the team. Both started every game, with Chiney scoring almost ten points per game. She hit 25 of 37 shot attempts for a team leading 67.6% shooting percentage. She helped the USA win all six games and earn the gold medal.

Overseas career 
In the 2014–15 European season, Ogwumike played in Italy for Famila Schio. During the 2016 WNBA season, Ogwumike had signed with Henan Phoenix of the WCBA for the 2016–17 Chinese season. In her fifth game with the team, Ogwumike scored 56 points (on 23 of 24 field goal shooting) along with 12 rebounds She would end up winning first round MVP, averaging 33.6 points per game and 12.4 rebounds per game, prior to her achilles injury.

WNBA career 
Ogwumike was drafted first overall in the 2014 WNBA draft by the Connecticut Sun. In her rookie season, Ogwumike became a starter, averaging a career-high 15.5 points per game and 7.5 rebounds per game. She was named a WNBA All-Star along with her sister Nneka Ogwumike, becoming the first pair of sisters to be selected into a WNBA All-Star game. Ogwumike would also win the WNBA Rookie of the Year Award in 2014.

Ogwumike sat out the entire 2015 season while recovering from a micro-fracture on her right knee that she sustained months before the season.

Ogwumike came back healthy for the 2016 season, playing 33 games with 18 starts while averaging 12.6 points per game. She had scored a career-high 26 points along with 15 rebounds in a regular season game win against the Dallas Wings. In December 2016, it was announced that Ogwumike had undergone surgery after injuring her achilles while playing overseas in China during the WNBA offseason. She was ruled out with an estimated recovery period of 6–9 months, which caused her to miss the 2017 WNBA season.

In April 2017, Ogwumike was suspended by the Sun for the entire 2017 season to free up a roster spot due to her injury and that same month she also signed a contract extension.

On May 20, 2018, Ogwumike made her return to the Sun in their season debut, playing her first WNBA game in two years. In 17 minutes of play, she scored 9 points in the starting lineup in a 101–65 victory over the Las Vegas Aces. On June 30, 2018, Ogwumike scored a new career-high of 30 points in a 103–92 loss to the Seattle Storm. Later on in the 2018 season, it was announced that Ogwumike was voted into the 2018 WNBA All-Star Game, making it her second all-star appearance. The Sun finished as the number 4 seed in the league with a 21–13 record, receiving a bye to the second round elimination game. The Sun would lose 96–86 to the Phoenix Mercury.

On April 28, 2019, Ogwumike was traded to the Los Angeles Sparks for a 2020 first round pick, reuniting her with her sister Nneka. The Sparks finished as the number 3 seed with a 22–12 record, receiving a bye to the second round. In the second round elimination game, the Sparks defeated the defending champion Seattle Storm 92–69. In the semi-finals, the Sparks were eliminated by her former team, the Connecticut Sun in a three-game sweep.

In June 2020, Ogwumike announced she would sit out the 2020 WNBA season due to health concerns of playing in the bubble during the COVID-19 pandemic. Without Ogwumike, the Sparks finished the season 15–7 as the number 3 seed with a bye to the second round but would get eliminated by the Connecticut Sun in the elimination game.

In February 2021, Ogwumike re-signed with the Sparks to a multi-year deal.

ESPN career 
In May 2018, Ogwumike signed a multi-year contract with ESPN to become a full-time basketball analyst. In August 2020, she became the first Black woman to host a national radio show for ESPN, while also becoming the first WNBA player to do so as well. She is one of the youngest commentators to be named a full-time NBA analyst for ESPN, while simultaneously playing in the WNBA. Ogwumike was partnered with Mike Golic Jr., as the co-host of the ESPN radio show Chiney & Golic Jr.. After the re-organization of ESPN's NBA coverage, she joined the daily series NBA Today as a rotating in-studio analyst.

College career statistics

WNBA statistics

Regular season 

|-
| style="text-align:left;"| 2014
| style="text-align:left;"| Connecticut
| 31 || 31 || 29.7 || .536 || .000 || .693 || 7.5 || 0.6 || 1.1 ||  1.1  || 1.9 || 15.5
|-
| style="text-align:left;"| 2016
| style="text-align:left;"| Connecticut
| 33 || 18 || 24.3 ||.587 || .000 || .719 || 6.7 || 0.7 || 1.0 || 1.0 || 1.5 || 12.6
|-
| style="text-align:left;"| 2018
| style="text-align:left;"| Connecticut
| 31 || 31 || 25.5 ||.603 || .500 || .797 || 7.3 || 1.0 || 1.1 || 0.6 || 1.6 || 14.4
|-
| style="text-align:left;"| 2019
| style="text-align:left;"| Los Angeles
| 32 || 14 || 21.8 || .494 || .250 || .809 || 5.8 || 0.8 || 1.0 || 0.7 || 1.3 || 9.6 
|-
| style="text-align:left;"| 2021
| style="text-align:left;"| Los Angeles
| 7 || 3 || 19.1 || .408 || .750 || .750 || 4.1 || 1.3 || 0.9 || 0.4 || 0.9 || 7.0
|-
| style="text-align:left;"| 2022
| style="text-align:left;"| Los Angeles
| 26 || 7 || 18.4 || .466 || .444 || .706 || 5.5 || 1.1 || 0.8 || 0.3 || 1.4 || 7.0
|-
| style="text-align:left;"| Career
| style="text-align:left;"| 6 years, 2 teams
| 160 || 104 || 23.9 || .541 || .464 || .742 || 6.7 || 0.9 || 1.0 || 0.8 || 1.5 || 11.8

Playoffs 

|-
| style="text-align:left;"| 2018
| style="text-align:left;"| Connecticut
| 1 || 0 || 19.1 || .200 || .000 || .000 || 3.0 || 1.0 || 2.0 || 0.0 || 0.0 || 2.0
|-
| style="text-align:left;"| 2019
| style="text-align:left;"| Los Angeles
| 4 || 0 || 16.6 || .500 || .000 || .857 || 3.3 || 0.8 || 0.8 || 0.5 || 0.8 || 6.0
|-
| style="text-align:left;"| Career
| style="text-align:left;"|2 years, 2 teams
| 5 || 0 || 17.1 || .435 || .000 || .857 || 3.2 || 0.8 || 1.0 || 0.4 || 0.6 || 5.2

Awards 
 2010—WBCA High School Coaches' All-America Team
 2011—All-Pacific-10 Conference Team
 2011—All-Pac-10 All-Defensive Team
 2011—All-Pac-10 Tournament Team
 2011—Pac-10 Freshman of the Year
 2013—Pac-12 Player of the Year
 2013—Pac-12 Defensive Player of the Year
 2014—ESPNW First Team All-American
 2014—USBWA All-American team
 2014—John R. Wooden Award
 2014—Pac-12 Player of the Year
 2014—Pac-12 Defensive Player of the Year
 2014—WNBA Rookie of the Year

Personal life 
Ogwumike is Catholic. Ogwumike's older sister Nneka Ogwumike also plays for the Los Angeles Sparks.

See also
 List of NCAA Division I women's basketball players with 2,500 points and 1,000 rebounds

References

External links 
 USA Basketball profile
 Stanford Cardinal bio
 

1992 births
Living people
African-American Catholics
African-American sports journalists
All-American college women's basketball players
American expatriate basketball people in China
American expatriate basketball people in Italy
American people of Igbo descent
American sportspeople of Nigerian descent
American women's 3x3 basketball players
American women's basketball players
Basketball players from Texas
Connecticut Sun draft picks
Connecticut Sun players
ESPN people
Henan Phoenix players
Los Angeles Sparks players
McDonald's High School All-Americans
Medalists at the 2011 Summer Universiade
Parade High School All-Americans (girls' basketball)
People from Cypress, Texas
Power forwards (basketball)
Sportspeople from Harris County, Texas
Stanford Cardinal women's basketball players
Universiade gold medalists for the United States
Universiade medalists in basketball
Women's National Basketball Association All-Stars
Women's National Basketball Association first-overall draft picks